is an anime series aired from 1976 to 1977 in Japan. There are 38 episodes aired at 25 minutes each.  It is also known as "Blocker Army IV Machine Blaster", "Blocker Corps IV", "Blocker Army IV", "Blocker Corps", "Machine Blaster" and in Italian as "Astrorobot Contatto Ypsilon" ("Blocker Corps IV Astrorobot" for the DVD release).

Original Story
Earth is being attacked by the Mogul civilization, a super advanced people that live beneath the ocean. Professor Yuri, having studied the ancient super-technology in Astro base, anticipated such an invasion would take place. Using what he had learned of their technology, he created a team of four super robots, piloted by four youth pilots, to help repel the Mogul invasion, and they are known as the Machine Blaster Corps. Led by the pilot Ishida, the Blocker Corps stands firm against the attack of the Mogul rulers, Hellqueen V and Kaibuddha.

Concept
The number 4 comes from the team of 4 robots.  The robots individually have their own weapon, but they can also be combined to form a fire ring which cuts through the enemies.  It was not the most popular show since anime powerhouses Gaiking and Combattler V, which featured more creative combinations and designs, were ruling the airwaves.

Staff

Robots

Opening
Lyrics: Blocker Gundan Machine Blaster (Opening Theme)

Todoroku raimei arashi wo tsuite
Yuke (yuke!) yuke yuke (yuke!) BLOCKER FOUR
Kitazo MOGURU jigoku no taigun
Mamore bokura no machi to umi wo
Moeru seigi no EREPAS komete
Ima da ATTACK engetsu kaiten
Kudaite miseruze aku no kiba
BLOCKER Gundan MACHINE BLASTER!!!

Trivia
 It was aired every week Monday 7:00pm to 7:30pm.
 It was aired in The Philippines as Striker Force over RPN-9 every Friday 5:30pm to 6:00pm in 1979 and in Italy as Astro Robot in 1980
Toy Maker Mattel produced Shogun Warriors figures of the Machine Blaster robots exclusively for the Italian Market recycling parts from the Shogun Gaiking, Brave Raideen and Grendizer toys and labeled as Astro Robot Shogun. These figures are considered by collectors to be the rarest figures in the entire Shogun toyline.

References

External links
Encirobot homepage
 

1976 anime television series debuts
1977 Japanese television series endings
Ashi Productions
Fuji TV original programming
Nippon Animation
Super robot anime and manga